Nässjö Municipality (Nässjö kommun) is a municipality in Jönköping County, southern Sweden where the town Nässjö is situated.

The present municipality was created in 1971 when the City of Nässjö (instituted in 1914) was amalgamated with five surrounding municipalities.

Localities
There are 11 urban areas (also called a Tätort or locality) in Nässjö Municipality.

In the table the localities are listed according to the size of the population as of December 31, 2005. The municipal seat is in bold characters.

Sister cities 
Nässjö has had two sister cities since the 1940s: Brønderslev in Denmark and Eidsberg in Norway.

References 
Official webpage, history section (parts in Swedish)
Statistics Sweden

External links 

Nässjö Municipality - Official site
Coat of arms

Municipalities of Jönköping County